Muppets: The Green Album is a cover album of twelve songs originally from the Muppets, covered by alternative rock and pop artists. The album was released by Walt Disney Records on August 23, 2011, on a digipak CD and as a digital download. A music video was also produced for the album's sole single; "Muppet Show Theme Song", featuring OK Go attempting to produce their own music video until they are interrupted by the Muppets' antics.

Walt Disney Records announced the album at the 2009 D23 Expo as Muppets Revisited with a projected 2010 release date.  The original project's name paralleled the title of Nightmare Revisited, the cover album that Disney had released for The Nightmare Before Christmas in 2008. The album was part of Disney's dualistic effort to revitalize the franchise and to promote the subsequent release of the seventh Muppet film, three months later. The album's name is derived as a parody of the Beatles' White Album and the artwork features a "typographic portrait" of Kermit the Frog's face, which is reminiscent of cover art derived from the rock albums of the 1960s.

Muppets: The Green Album was generally well received by critics and debuted at number 1 on both Billboard's Rock Albums and Alternative Albums charts. With an estimated 30,000 copies initially sold, the album also peaked at number 8 on the Billboard 200 chart, becoming the first Muppet album to reach the top 10.

Release and promotion
Walt Disney Records made the entire album available for preview through NPR's First Listen program a week before release.

The music video for "Muppet Show Theme Song" was released online and for purchase on August 19, 2011. On August 31, OK Go and Animal had a live performance on The Tonight Show with Jay Leno.

Music video
The members of OK Go are preparing to sing "The Muppet Show Theme" (titled as "Muppet Show Theme Song" on the album), with the help of an elaborate machine, which is inadvertently destroyed by Sweetums. The band is then shown through recreations of their own music videos and homages of traditional Muppet Show sketches, while being accompanied by The Muppets. Statler and Waldorf, are shown at one point briefly watching the video from a computer, but are not satisfied with the Muppets' performances as usual and decide to watch cat videos instead. The video concludes/ends with a series of pseudo-fictional dream sequences, such as Damian Kulash waking up in terror while sleeping with Animal, Dr. Teeth, and Floyd Pepper, Dr. Teeth himself, waking up alongside the OK Go members, and Tim Nordwind finding himself next to Rowlf the Dog, Foo-Foo, a sheep and Kulash's dog, Bunny. The video alludes to former OK Go music videos, including; "Here It Goes Again", "This Too Shall Pass", "All Is Not Lost" and "White Knuckles".

The video has been broadcast on the Disney Channel, Disney XD and Radio Disney. It won the People's Voice Webby Award for the "Viral Video" category at the 16th Annual Webby Awards.

Muppet performers
Steve Whitmire – Kermit the Frog, Rizzo the Rat, Beaker, Statler, The Muppet Newsman, Bean Bunny, Link Hogthrob, Foo-Foo
Eric Jacobson – Miss Piggy, Fozzie Bear, Animal, Sam Eagle, Marvin Suggs
Dave Goelz – The Great Gonzo, Bunsen Honeydew, Waldorf, Zoot, Beauregard, Purple Frackle
Bill Barretta – Rowlf the Dog, Dr. Teeth, Pepé the King Prawn, Swedish Chef, Bobo the Bear, Mahna Mahna
David Rudman – Scooter, Janice, Nigel, Beautiful Day Monster, Penguin
Matt Vogel – Sweetums, Camilla the Chicken, Floyd Pepper, Crazy Harry, Uncle Deadly, Pops, Dr. Julius Strangepork, Lew Zealand, Angel Marie

Reception

Muppets: The Green Album received mixed to positive reviews from music critics. At Metacritic, which assigns a normalized rating out of 100 to reviews from mainstream critics, the album received an average score of 60, based on 8 reviews, indicating "mixed or average reviews".

Chrysta Cherrie of AllMusic concluded her review by stating that, "Muppets: The Green Album freshens up the franchise for the newish millennium, and Generation Z listeners will enjoy hearing current artists in this different context, but other listeners may be left reaching for their classic Muppets fare." A Sputnikmusic reviewer said that "too few of the artists approach the material with the right ideas". Jeremy Frye wrote that the album's potency largely depended on the nostalgia factor; "If you were to see The Green Album sitting on the counter at Starbucks and consider making an impulse buy because you love The Muppets, I’d say go for it. As tributes to significant portions of your childhood go, it could be much worse."

Conversely, Cinema Blend's Joseph Giannone favorably compared the album to The Muppet Show saying that, "Like the original program, The Green Album is an eclectic, smart and eccentric journey through each guest appearance's effort." Consequence of Sound wrote that; "All that's 'green' isn't necessarily gold here, but most of it shines." Elizabeth Keenan of MTV Geek!, commented that, "The album fits well in the grand tradition of the Muppets' connections with real-world pop culture." Alistair McGeorge described the album in her Female First review as "good for a nostalgic listen, the songs have a surprising amount of strength in this setting, and it's a good collection in its own right." Doug Wortel awarded the album an 8 out of 10, while positively remarking that, "The wonderful thing about The Green Album that sets it apart from those other records, besides the source material, is nearly every performer on this album sounds like they’re having a ball, which is exactly what any Jim Henson fan would want from a record like this."

In regards to the album's roster of artists, Sara Baumberger wrote that the selected songs were paired effectively well. Spin's Mikael Wood praised Andrew Bird's rendition of "Bein' Green" remarking, "Andrew Bird sidesteps the precious self-pity you'd expect from "Bein' Green": His Kermit gets the clever-to-cuddly ratio just right." Web Behrens of Time Out Chicago spoke highly of OK Go's cover; "Layering in everything from electronica to a perfectly quirky "Flight of the Bumblebees" sample, the homegrown band knows just how to push the envelope. We loved it even before we saw the video, which is sure to be another viral hit for Kulash and Company, taking their trippy cover to an even higher level." Peter Chianca of Wicked Local, wrote in regards to Weezer and Hayley Williams' cover; "complete with twittering swamp sounds, approximates the wistfulness that the late Jim Henson brought to the original." Chianca also noted that, "Alkaline Trio's punky take on "Movin' Right Along" is the album's standout, riffing playfully on the Kermit-and-Fozzie banter." John Terauds of the Toronto Star commended the album as a whole, highlighting that, "The finest treats come from two of the gentlest and most memorable melodies brought to us by Kermit the Frog: "Rainbow Connection", where Hayley Williams of Paramore sweetly recaptures the original's innocent wonder and longing, boosted by Weezer's pastel-swampy backdrop; and Andrew Bird's clean, frank delivery of "Bein' Green"."

Track listing

Personnel

"Muppet Show Theme Song"
 OK Go – production
 Damian Kulash – lead vocals, guitar
 Tim Nordwind – bass guitar and vocals
 Dan Konopka – drums, percussion
 Andy Ross – lead guitar, keyboard, vocals
 Dave Fridmann – mixing

"Rainbow Connection"
 Allison Allport – harp
 Blake Mills – guitar
 Brian Malouf – mixing
 Shawn Everett – recording
 Jake Sinclair – recording

"Mahna Mahna"
 The Fray – production
 Warren Huart – production, engineering and mixing
 Mark Gray – assistant engineer
 Robin Holden – mixing assistant

"Movin' Right Along"
 Matt Allison – production, mixing

"Our World"
 Yin Yames – production
 Kevin Ratterman – mixing

"Halfway Down the Stairs"
 Will Hunt – production, programming
 Amy Lee – organ, production
 Daniel Mendez – mixing

"Mr. Bassman"
 Sondre Lerche – lead vocals, guitar, bass
 Kato Ådland – banjo, beatboxing, mixing

"Wishing Song"
 Pete Min  – production
 Mikel Jollett – production

"Night Life"
 Ryan Williams – production, mixing
 Brandon Saller – drums, vocals, keyboards, additional bass
 Billy Martin – guitar, bass, additional vocals
 Ashley Saller – additional vocals
 Lindsey Martin – additional vocals
 Dravyn Martin – additional vocals

"Bein' Green"
 Andrew Bird – violin, vocals, guitar, production
 Kevin O'Donnell – drums
 Chris Scruggs – bass, lap steel guitar
 William Tyler – guitar
 Mark Nevers – mixing
 Amanda Hassell – assistant

"I Hope That Something Better Comes Along"
 Mark Weinberg – production
 Dan Eisenberg – piano, B3
 Aaron Tap – backing vocals

"I'm Going to Go Back There Someday"
 Mike Viola – tack piano, P bass, acoustic guitar, backing vocals, production
 Paul Ahlstrand – strings, reed
 Ducky Carlise – percussion, mixing
 Tim Mayer – flute, alto flute
 Jerry Vejmola – oboe
 Michael Rosenbloom – violin
 Jean Haig – viola
 Ron Lowry – cello

Album credits
 Dani Markman – executive producer
 Melissa Bolton – business and legal affairs
 Stephen Marcussen – mastering
 Steve Gerdes – creative direction and album design

Charts

See also
Nightmare Revisited
Almost Alice
 Frankenweenie: Unleashed!
The Muppets: Original Soundtrack
The Muppets: A Green and Red Christmas

References

External links
 Official site at Walt Disney Records
 Muppets: The Green Album at Amazon.com
 "OK Go" music video at  YouTube

2011 compilation albums
Alternative rock compilation albums
Concept albums
Covers albums
Disney albums
Indie rock compilation albums
The Muppets albums
Pop rock compilation albums
Power pop compilation albums
Soft rock compilation albums
Tribute albums
Walt Disney Records compilation albums